Paradosi Ballet Company was founded in 2007 as the first professional Christian ballet company in the Pacific Northwest. 
Paradosi is a 501(c)(3) nonprofit Christian dance company that was established with the goal of sharing the love and teachings of Jesus through dance, drama, and personal witness.  The organizations mission is to: "Worship God, Love People, Share the Gospel, and to Make Disciples of Jesus Everywhere We Go".  The organization uses dance in Christian ministry by sharing Bible based story ballets, leading worship in churches, dancing during evangelistic outreach events, sharing the gospel message, and through the sharing of personal testimonies from the stage.

Touring Company
Paradosi's touring company performs throughout the US and internationally using dance as an evangelism tool, leading Christian churches in worship, and teaching master classes and choreography at studios and Universities.  The touring company has toured extensively within the United States and in 2011 began embarking on international outreach tours.  The touring company's primary international focus has been in France and Switzerland partnering with local and international ministry teams for evangelistic events during major arts festivals such as the Festival d'Avignon and Montreux Jazz Festival.

Ballet Ministry Apprentice Program
Paradosi's ballet ministry apprentice program began in 2011 as a Christian ballet trainee program that over the years has been molded into an immersive apprenticeship program with the dancers training and serving along side the Touring Company.  The Apprentice Program was developed to help dancers to continue growing as artists while learning how to use dance in ministry settings.  The Apprentice Program serves to feed dancers into the touring company while also preparing them to dance with other Christian ballet companies, become dance teachers, and to serve in other areas of Christian ministry.  Dancers in the Apprentice Program participate in outreach opportunities with the touring company at local churches, nursing homes, assisted living facilities, homeless shelters, and schools.

School of Dance
Paradosi's dance school, Surrendered School of Dance, formerly called Surrendered School of the Arts    was established in 2009.  The school offers dance classes in ballet, contemporary dance, hip hop, and expressive sign language for students from the ages of three through adult at four campuses in Tacoma, Orting, and Gig Harbor in Washington state.  The schools Dance Ensemble, which is open to students in Ballet 3 and higher, dances and shares with audiences at local nursing homes, assisted living facilities, and churches.

Annual Summer Dance Intensive
Each summer Paradosi hosts an annual summer dance intensive for students ages 11 to 21 in Tacoma, Washington that draws students from across the United States and internationally.  During the intensive students are exposed to different dance styles while learning choreography, participating in daily chapels, and Bible studies. At the end of the intensive students have an opportunity to share what they have learned during a gala performance for their family and friends.

Choreographers
Paradosi does not have one set choreographer.  Paradosi pulls from the talent within the ministry, both current and past members, encouraging creative worshipful expression from the members of the ministry to keep the repertoire fresh and interesting for audiences.

Current Contributing choreographers include: Larissa Bischoff, Tabi Spurlin, Skylar Moore, Annie Dick, Roshelle Howard, Bonnie Calvert, Tennille Carver, Hope Livingston, Amanda Moore

Repertoire
Credo - I Believe (2023 - )

The Carols of Christmas (2018 - )

Abide (2021 - 2022)

All Things New (2020 - 2021)

Living Hope (2019 - 2020)

Carols of Christmas (2016 - 2017)

Closer (2016 - 2018)

Identity (2014 - 2015)

Forever (2014 - 2016)

I AM (2013 - 2014)

Awakening (2012 - 2013)

Remember When (2011 - 2015)

Commissioned (2008 - 2015)

A Walk With Paul (2008 - 2013)

Sealed (2011 - 2012)

Project Grace (2007 - 2010)

External links 
 Paradosi Ballet Company website
 Western Seminary CLD: September 1, 2019: Partners in Action
 News & Events of Grand Canyon University: April 20, 2017: Paradosi Ballet Guest Choreographer
 Methow Arts:  September 27, 2015: Paradosi Ballet Company at The Merc Playhouse
  The Topeka Capital Journal: August 28, 2014:  Bill Blankenship: Lacee Ebert Prepares to Step Into Ballet Leadership Role
 The University Place Patch: January 30, 2014: Surrendered School of the Arts Celebrates 5 years!
 Surrender Magazine: February 2013: Pages 27-35: Living Worship, A Peek Inside Paradosi Ballet Company

Notes 

Christian performing arts
Ballet companies in the United States
Dance in Washington (state)
Christian organizations based in the United States